Turoyo (Ṭūr ‘Abdinian Aramaic), also referred to as modern Surayt, or modern Suryoyo, is a Central Neo-Aramaic language traditionally spoken in the Tur Abdin region in southeastern Turkey and in northern Syria.  Turoyo speakers are mostly adherents of the Syriac Orthodox Church, but there are also some Turoyo-speaking adherents of the Assyrian Church of the East and the Chaldean Catholic Church, especially from the towns of Midyat and Qamishli. The language is also spoken throughout diaspora, among modern Assyrians/Syriacs. It is classified as a vulnerable language. Most speakers use the Classical Syriac language for literature and worship.  Turoyo is not mutually intelligible with Western Neo-Aramaic, having been separated for over a thousand years; its closest relatives are Mlaḥsô and western varieties of Northeastern Neo-Aramaic like Suret.

Etymology

Term  comes from the word , meaning 'mountain', thus designating a specific Neo-Aramaic language of the mountain region of Tur Abdin in southeastern part of modern Turkey (hence Turabdinian Aramaic).

Term Surayt is commonly used by its speakers, as a general designation for their language, modern or historical. However, especially in the diaspora, the language is frequently called Surayt, Suryoyo (or Surayt, Sŭryoyo or Süryoyo depending on dialect), meaning "Syriac" in general. Since it has developed as one of western variants of the Syriac language, Turoyo is sometimes also referred to as Western Neo-Syriac.

History

Turoyo has evolved from the Eastern Aramaic colloquial varieties that have been spoken in Tur Abdin and the surrounding plain for more than a thousand years since the initial introduction of Aramaic to the region. However, it has also been influenced by Classical Syriac, which itself was the variety of the Eastern Middle Aramaic spoken farther west, in the city of Edessa, today known as Urfa. Due to the proximity of Tur Abdin to Edessa, and the closeness of their parent languages, meant that Turoyo bears a greater similarity to Classical Syriac than do Northeastern Neo-Aramaic varieties.

The homeland of Turoyo is the Tur Abdin region in southeastern Turkey. This region is a traditional stronghold of Syriac Orthodox Christians. The Turoyo-speaking population prior to the Syriac genocide largely adhered to the Syriac Orthodox Church. In 1970, it was estimated that there were 20,000 Turoyo-speakers still living in the area, however, they gradually migrated to Western Europe and elsewhere in the world. The Turoyo-speaking diaspora is now estimated at 250.000  In the diaspora communities, Turoyo is usually a second language which is supplemented by more mainstream languages. The language is considered endangered by UNESCO, but efforts are still made by Turoyo-speaking communities to sustain the language through use in homelife, school programs to teach Turoyo on the weekends, and summer day camps. Today only hundreds of speakers remain in Tur Abdin.

Until recently, Turoyo was a spoken vernacular and was never written down: Kthobonoyo (Classical Syriac) was the written language. In the 1880s, various attempts were made, with the encouragement of western missionaries, to write Turoyo in the Syriac alphabet, in the Serto and in Estrangelo script used for West-Syriac Kthobhonoyo. One of the first comprehensive studies of the language was published in 1881, by orientalists Eugen Prym and Albert Socin, who classified it as a Neo-Aramaic dialect.

However, with upheaval in their homeland through the twentieth century, many Turoyo speakers have emigrated around the world (particularly to Syria, Lebanon, Sweden and Germany). The Swedish government's education policy, that every child be educated in his or her first tongue, led to the commissioning of teaching materials in Turoyo. Yusuf Ishaq thus developed an alphabet for Turoyo based on the Latin script. Silas Üzel also created a separate Latin alphabet for Turoyo in Germany.

A series of reading books and workbooks that introduce Ishaq's alphabet are called , or "Come Let's Read!" This project has also produced a Swedish-Turoyo dictionary of 4500 entries: the Svensk-turabdinskt Lexikon: Leksiqon Swedoyo-Suryoyo. Another old teacher, writer and translator of Turoyo is Yuhanun Üzel (born in Miden in 1934) who in 2009 finished the translation of the Peshitta Bible in Turoyo, with Benjamin Bar Shabo and Yahkup Bilgic, in Serto (West-Syriac) and Latin script, a foundation for the "Aramaic-Syriac language".

Dialects
Turoyo has borrowed some words from Arabic, Kurdish, Armenian, and Turkish. The main dialect of Turoyo is that of Midyat (Mëḏyoyo), in the east of Turkey's Mardin Province. Every village have distinctive dialects (Midwoyo, Kfarzoyo, `Iwarnoyo, Nihloyo and Izloyo, respectively). All Turoyo dialects are mutually intelligible with each other. There is a dialectal split between the town of Midyat and the villages, with only slight differences between the individual villages. A closely related language or dialect, Mlaḥsô, spoken in two villages in Diyarbakir, is now deemed extinct.

Alphabet
Turoyo is written both in Latin and Syriac (Serto) characters. The orthography below was the outcome of the International Surayt Conference held at the University of Cambridge (27–30 August 2015).

Attempts to write down Turoyo have begun since the 16th century, with Jewish Neo-Aramaic adaptions and translations of Biblical texts, commentaries, as well as hagiographic stories, books, and folktales in Christian dialects. The East Syriac Bishop Mar Yohannan working with American missionary Rev. Justin Perkins also tried to write the vernacular version of religious texts, culminating in the production of school-cards in 1836.

In 1970s Germany, members of the Aramean evangelical movement (Aramäische Freie Christengemeinde) used Turoyo to write short texts and songs. The Syriac evangelical movement has also published over 300 Turoyo hymns in a compedium named Kole Ruhonoye in 2012, as well as translating the four gospels with Mark and John being published so far.

The alphabet as used in a forthcoming translation of New Peshitta in Turoyo by Yuhanun Bar Shabo, Sfar mele surtoṯoyo – Picture dictionary and Benjamin Bar Shabo's Alice's Adventures in Wonderland.

In the 1970s, educator Yusuf Ishaq attempted to systematically incorporate the Turoyo language into a Latin orthography, which resulted in a series of reading books, entitled [toxu qorena]. Although this system is not used outside of Sweden, other Turoyo speakers have developed their own non-standardized Latin script to use the language on digital platforms.

The Swedish government's "mother-tongue education" project treated Turoyo as an immigrant language, like Arabic, Turkish, Kurdish, and began to teach the language in schools. The staff of the National Swedish Institute for Teaching Material produced a Latin letter-based alphabet, grammar, dictionary, school books, and instructional material. Due to religious and political objections, the project was halted.

There are other efforts to translate famous works of literature, including The Aramaic Students Association's translation of The Little Prince, the Nisbin Foundation's translation of Cinderella and Little Red Riding Hood.

Phonology
Phonetically, Turoyo is very similar to Classical Syriac.

The most distinctive feature of Turoyo phonology is its use of reduced vowels in closed syllables. The phonetic value of such reduced vowels differs depending both on the value of original vowel and the dialect spoken. The Miḏyoyo dialect also reduces vowels in pre-stress open syllables. That has the effect of producing a syllabic schwa in most dialects (in Classical Syriac, the schwa is not syllabic).

Consonants

Vowels 
Turoyo has the following set of vowels:

Morphology
The verbal system of Turoyo is similar to that used in other Neo-Aramaic languages. In Classical Syriac, the ancient perfect and imperfect tenses had started to become preterite and future tenses respectively, and other tenses were formed by using the participles with pronominal clitics or shortened forms of the verb hwā ('to become'). Most modern Aramaic languages have completely abandoned the old tenses and form all tenses from stems based around the old participles. The classical clitics have become incorporated fully into the verb form, and can be considered more like inflections.

Turoyo has also developed the use of the demonstrative pronouns much more than any other Aramaic language. In Turoyo, they have become definite articles:
masculine singular: u malko (the king)
feminine singular: i malëkṯo (the queen)
plural common: am malke (the kings), am malkoṯe (the queens).

The other Central Neo-Aramaic dialect, of Mlahsô and Ansha villages in Diyarbakır Province is somewhat different from Turoyo. It is virtually extinct; its last few speakers live in Qamishli in northeastern Syria and in the diaspora.

Syntax 
Turoyo has three sets of particles that take the place of the copula in nominal clauses: enclitic copula, independent copula, and emphatic independent copula. In Turoyo, the non-enclitic copula (or the existential particle) is articulated with the use of two sets of particles: kal and kit.

See also

References

Sources

External links
 Turoyo alphabets and pronunciation at Omniglot

Semitisches Tonarchiv: Dokumentgruppe "Aramäisch/Turoyo" 
The Turoyo language today 
Syriac Turoyo-Bible
Turoyo is studied and taught at the HSE Institute for Oriental and Classical Studies

Eastern Aramaic languages
Languages of Syria
Languages of Turkey
Neo-Aramaic languages
Endangered Afroasiatic languages
Tur Abdin
Languages of Kurdistan